The Dodol Depok is a typical sweet rice cake from Depok made by glutinous rice, red sugar, and pandanus leaf. 
The Dodol Depok was already there since the days of the Dutch who settled at Depok Lama.
In those days, The Dodol Depok into a cake that is always served at each meeting conducted by the Dutch functionary, and its workers.

References

Indonesian cuisine
Glutinous rice dishes